Elvis Plori (born 5 August 1978 in Shkodër) is an Albanian football coach and former player.

Managerial career
He was appointed coach of Burreli in January 2012 and reappointed later again in 2012 and of Tërbuni Pukë in 2014-15.
Plori was named manager of Besëlidhja in June 2017 and took charge of Kastrioti in June 2018.

He left Burreli for a fourth time in summer 2019 for another spell at Besëlidhja.

References

External links
 Profile - FSHF

1978 births
Living people
Footballers from Shkodër
Albanian footballers
Association football midfielders
KF Laçi players
KF Vllaznia Shkodër players
Kategoria Superiore players
Albanian football managers
KF Vllaznia Shkodër managers
KS Burreli managers
KF Tërbuni Pukë managers
KS Kastrioti managers
Besëlidhja Lezhë managers
Kategoria Superiore managers